Saint-Sauveur is a commune in the Gironde department in Nouvelle-Aquitaine in southwestern France.

The Haut-Médoc AOC winery Château Hourtin-Ducasse is located in the commune.

Population

See also
Communes of the Gironde department

References

Communes of Gironde